HealthONE is the largest healthcare system in the metro Denver area, with 10,000 employees and 3,000 affiliated physicians. HealthOne is a part of HCA Healthcare.

HealthONE was established when P/SL Healthcare bought AMI's Colorado assets in 1991. That entity merged with Swedish Hospital to become P/SL Swedish, and the HealthONE name was adopted in late 1993; it was purchased from a health care system in Minnesota, which had used the moniker until merging with another company in 1992. From 1995 to 2011, it was co-owned by HCA and the Colorado Health Foundation; HCA bought the remaining stake for $1.45 billion in 2011.

Affiliated hospitals and medical centers
 The Medical Center of Aurora 
 North Suburban Medical Center and North Suburban Northeast ER
 Presbyterian/St. Luke's Medical Center and Rocky Mountain Hospital for Children
 Rose Medical Center
 Sky Ridge Medical Center
 Spalding Rehabilitation Hospital
 Swedish Medical Center and Swedish Southwest ER
 AirLife Denver
 Rocky Mountain Hospital for Children (RMHC)

References

External links
 official site

Healthcare in Colorado
HCA Healthcare